Kaumalapau is an unincorporated community in Maui County on the island of Lanai in the state of Hawaii.

Kaumalapau is a name derived from the Hawaiian language meaning "soot placed in gardens". Kaumalapau was declared the "most difficult to pronounce" place name in the state of Hawaii by Reader's Digest.

References

Unincorporated communities in Maui County, Hawaii
Populated places on Maui
Unincorporated communities in Hawaii